A Wide Open Town is a 1922 American silent drama film directed by Ralph Ince and starring Conway Tearle, Faire Binney and James Seeley.

Cast
 Conway Tearle as Billy Clifford
 Faire Binney as Helen Morely
 James Seeley as Mayor Morely
 Harry Tighe as Tug Wilson
 Claude Brooks as Fred Tatum
 Ned Sparks as Si Ryan
 Danny Hayes as Rufe Nimbo
 John P. Wade as Gov. Talbot
 Alice May as Mrs. Tatum
 Bobby Connelly as Gov. Talbot as a boy
 Jerry Devine as Billy Clifford as a boy

References

Bibliography
 Munden, Kenneth White. The American Film Institute Catalog of Motion Pictures Produced in the United States, Part 1. University of California Press, 1997.

External links
 

1922 films
1922 drama films
1920s English-language films
American silent feature films
Silent American drama films
American black-and-white films
Films directed by Ralph Ince
Selznick Pictures films
1920s American films